The Newfoundland fifty cent piece was the last denomination to be added to the Victorian coinage. Its first year of issue was 1870. The laureate portrait is stylistically unlike anything used for the rest of British North America. The denomination became very popular and assumed importance after the failure of the Commercial and Union Banks of Newfoundland during the financial crisis of 1894.

Laureated portrait, 1870-1900
Specifications

Mintages

The 1896 has two varieties: with a Large W or Small W in 'Newfoundland' on the obverse.
The 1898 has a couple of varieties: Obverse 1 with a Large W and Obverse 2 with a Small W. It is debated if there is an Obverse 1 with a Small W.
The 1899 has two varieties: a Wide 99 or a Narrow 99. Sometimes only one of the 9's may be noticeably smaller than the other numbers.

Edward VII, 1904-1909
Specifications

Mintages

George V, 1911-1919
Specifications

Mintages

References

 0.50
Fifty-cent coins